Viasat Kino Action is a television channel broadcasting action movies to Russia, Ukraine, Commonwealth of Independent States countries and the Baltic states. It broadcasts international action movies. Movies are dubbed into Russian and subtitled into Estonian, Latvian and Lithuanian.

In the Nordic region TV1000 Action was rebranded in February, 2009. TV1000 Action East was rebranded later in 2009.

In March 1, 2023, TV1000 Action East renamed to Viasat Kino Action. It happened when Russia changed its seal to Viju and it called Viju TV1000 action.

See also
TV1000 (disambiguation)

References

External links
Official site

Modern Times Group
Television channels in Russia
Television channels and stations established in 2008